SCRA  may refer to:

 Securities Contracts (Regulation) Act, 1956 
 Scottish Children's Reporter Administration
 Scottish Countryside Rangers Association
 Servicemembers Civil Relief Act
 South Carolina Research Authority, a research organization in South Carolina
 Southern Contemporary Rock Assembly, an Australian jazz-rock group (1971–72) 
 Special Class Railway Apprentice, an Indian railway apprenticeship
 Sugar City Ratepayers Alliance, a Fijian political party
 SC Rheindorf Altach, an Austrian association football team based in Altach
 Supreme Court Reports Annotated of the Supreme Court of the Philippines; used in case citations
 Synthetic Cannabinoids, as in Synthetic Cannabinoid Receptor Agonist